This is a list of countries by global financial assets, the total privately owned assets by residents payable in currency, stocks, and bonds. This table is based upon the Allianz Global Wealth Report 2010, 2011, 2012, 2013, 2014, 2015, 2016 and 2017.

References

See also
 List of countries by corporate debt
 List of countries by household debt
 List of countries by external debt
 List of countries by public debt

International rankings